Jeff Cacciatore is a retired American soccer forward who played professionally in the North American Soccer League and the Major Indoor Soccer League. Cacciatore was elected into the Saint Louis Soccer Hall of Fame in 2013.

Youth
In 1976, Cacciatore, younger brother of Steve Cacciatore, graduated from St. Louis University High School.  He attended Southern Illinois University Edwardsville, playing on the men's soccer team from 1976 to 1979.  In his last season, the team won the 1979 NCAA Men's Division I Soccer Championship.  On October 24, 2009, SIUE inducted Cacciatore into the school's Athletic Hall of Fame.

Professional
In the fall of 1979, Cacciatore signed with the Fort Lauderdale Strikers of the North American Soccer League.  He played two indoor and one outdoor season with the Strikers. He was a member of the 1980 Soccer Bowl runner-up Strikers team that fell to the New York Cosmos 3–0 in the final.

He then moved to the St. Louis Steamers of the Major Indoor Soccer League in the fall of 1981.  He played six season before being released and retiring in 1987.

Cacciatore coaches the Whitfield School girls' soccer team and all levels of boys. Cacciatore also teaches at Whitfield School, where he's taught science for Eight Graders since 1991.

References

External links
NASL stats

1958 births
Living people
American soccer players
Fort Lauderdale Strikers (1977–1983) players
Major Indoor Soccer League (1978–1992) players
North American Soccer League (1968–1984) indoor players
North American Soccer League (1968–1984) players
SIU Edwardsville Cougars men's soccer players
Soccer players from St. Louis
St. Louis Steamers (original MISL) players
Association football forwards